Drayton is a hamlet in Worcestershire, England which remains part of the ecclesiastical parish of Chaddesley Corbett, which from its select vestry formed a civil parish and which also continues.

Belne Brook, which originates in the Clent Hills and is a tributary of the River Stour, flows equally through Belbroughton immediately upstream and through Drayton.

History

Charcoal and water-powered forges were a major feature in the area, the water used to turn sharpening wheels for scythe-making. There was once a water-mill here: there is still a mill-pond, a mill building (which now houses local businesses) and 19th century terraced housing, all of which is evidence of the former industry.

Notes

Villages in Worcestershire